"If I Kiss You (Will You Go Away)" is a popular 1967 song by country singer Lynn Anderson.

Summary
"If I Kiss You" became Anderson's first top-ten single, paving the way for eight number ones and 18 top tens to come.  Anderson's first single "Ride, Ride, Ride", also released in 1967, made the Country Top 40. "If I Kiss You (Will You Go Away)" reached the Top 5 on the Country chart. The song was written by her mother, legendary country music singer-songwriter, Liz Anderson.

Lynn Anderson performed "If I Kiss You", with Kimmosato, on the Lawrence Welk Show where she was a regular during the 1967 - 1968 season. "If I Kiss You" was followed up by a couple other quirky country numbers that became hits, like "That's a No No", "Big Girls Don't Cry", (not to be confused with the song "Big Girls Don't Cry" by Frankie Valli and the Four Seasons) and "Flattery Will Get You Everywhere", all hits for her in the late 1960s.

Chart performance

References                 

Songs about kissing
Songs written by Liz Anderson
Lynn Anderson songs
1967 singles
Columbia Records singles
1967 songs